The 2010–11 Macedonian First League was the 19th season of the Macedonian First Football League, the highest football league of Macedonia. It began on 31 July 2010 and ended on 28 May 2011. Renova were the defending champions having won their first Macedonian championship last season.

The competition was won by Shkëndija, who earned their first overall Macedonian title. FK Skopje and Pelister were relegated to the Second League. Vardar were spared from relegation because of fusion with Miravci.

Promotion and relegation 

1 Makedonija Gjorche Petrov and Sloga Jugomagnat were expelled from the First League due to boycotting two matches in the season. However, Napredok was directly promoted.2 Pobeda was expelled from the First League due to the eight-year suspension from FIFA for their involvement in match-fixing scandal.3 Vardar was initially relegated, but was stayed after was merged with Miravci, which won play-off match against Skopje. Later, the two sides were separated and Miravci were refused a First League licence.

Participating teams

League table

Results
The schedule consisted of three rounds. During the first two rounds, each team played each other once home and away for a total of 22 matches. The pairings of the third round were then set according to the standings after the first two rounds, giving every team a third game against each opponent for a total of 33 games per team.

Matches 1–22

Matches 23–33

Relegation playoff

Top goalscorers

Source: Soccerway

See also
2010–11 Macedonian Football Cup
2010–11 Macedonian Second Football League
2010–11 Macedonian Third Football League

External links
Football Federation of Macedonia 
MacedonianFootball.com

References

Macedonia
1
Macedonian First Football League seasons